A recitation song or "recitation" as it is more commonly called, is a spoken narrative of a song, generally with a sentimental (or at times, religious) theme.  Such numbers were quite popular in country music from the 1930s into the 1960s, although there were only few in number.  While they almost disappeared in the 1970s, that decade saw several of the biggest recitation songs of all time: Red Sovine's sentimental ode to an ill child "Teddy Bear" and C. W. McCall's truck-driving saga "Convoy", both songs hitting number one on the country charts and even crossing over into the pop market.  McCall, who did not sing, became a popular country star in the 1970s with a string of recitations, most of them comic, although his last hit, 1977's "Roses for Mama" was a sentimental tale in the best Sovine tradition. A number of Elvis Presley's and Johnny Cash's songs, as well as a number of songs from other genres of popular music and a number of gospel songs, also featured recitations.

Notable examples
 "Albuquerque" by "Weird" Al Yankovic
 "The Americans" by Byron MacGregor
 "A Boy Named Sue" by Johnny Cash
 "Colorado Kool-Aid" by Johnny Paycheck
 "Deck of Cards" by T. Texas Tyler
 "Giddyup Go" by Red Sovine
 "I.O.U." by Jimmy Dean
 "Mama Sang a Song" by Bill Anderson
 "Old Rivers"  by Walter Brennan
 "Ragged Old Flag" by Johnny Cash
 "That Was Yesterday" by Donna Fargo

Semi-recitation songs
Semi-recitation songs were also very popular during this period.  In a semi-recitation song, the verse, or part of a verse, is spoken and the chorus is sung.

Hits of this nature:
 "500 Miles Away from Home" by Bobby Bare
 "Are You Lonesome Tonight?" by Elvis Presley
 "Big Bad John" by Jimmy Dean
 "Detroit City" by Bobby Bare
 "Don't Take It Away" by Conway Twitty
 "The Devil Went Down to Georgia" by The Charlie Daniels Band
 "The End of the World" by Skeeter Davis
 "Fire Coming Out (Of the Monkey's Head)" by Gorillaz
 "Honey Come Back" by Glen Campbell
 "I Dreamed of a Hillbilly Heaven" by Tex Ritter
 "I Gave My Wedding Dress Away" by Kitty Wells
 "It's Hard to Be Humble" by Mac Davis
 "Leader of the Pack" by The Shangri-Las
 "One Piece at a Time" by Johnny Cash
 "Set Him Free" by Skeeter Davis
 "Still" by Bill Anderson
 "That's When Your Heartaches Begin" by Elvis Presley
 "Tribute" by Tenacious D
 "Uneasy Rider" by The Charlie Daniels Band
 "U.S. Male" by Elvis Presley
 "What Would You Do (If Jesus Came to Your House)" by Porter Wagoner

References